is a 2015 Japanese supernatural horror film and the eleventh installment of the Ju-on franchise. The film is a direct sequel to Ju-on: The Beginning of the End, set in that film's continuity and was marketed as the final film in the Ju-on franchise. The film was produced and co-written by Takashige Ichise and directed and co-written by Masayuki Ochiai. The film was released on June 20, 2015.

Plot
Like previous films in the series, Ju-on: The Final Curse is told in an anachronistic order through eight vignettes titled after characters featured in the story. They are, in order: Mai (麻衣), Reo (玲央), Ena (絵菜), Madoka (まどか), Toshio (俊雄), Midori (碧), Sota (奏太), and Kayako (伽椰子). The synopsis presents a rough chronology of the film's plot.

Reo Hasegawa, a high school girl living with Maki, her single mother, gets to live with her maternal cousin, Toshio Saeki, who has recently lost his parents. Ever since Toshio moves into her house, strange things begin to happen, including hauntings by Toshio's mother, Kayako, experienced by both Reo and Maki. Reo's friend, Midori, is disturbed after a creepy encounter with Toshio and decides to do a karaoke while mourning for her older sister, Yayoi, who went missing nine years ago. Her karaoke screen distorts into a freakish image, and when she returns from the restroom, Midori sees apparitions of Yayoi and a meowing Toshio. Yayoi then grabs Midori and kills her by throwing her into the ceiling. Reo's other friend, Madoka, searches about Toshio and finds the truth about the deaths of his parents, Reo's uncle Takeo, and Kayako. Just after she uploads the information to Reo, Madoka sees Toshio's ghost, who boils her from the inside.

Reo sneaks into Toshio's room and finds him motionless. When she is grabbed by another Toshio, Reo freaks out and falls down the stairs. She and Maki board themselves from Kayako, but the latter realizes that the ghosts will never let them go. She heads into the kitchen to arm herself with a knife and gets killed by Kayako. Swearing revenge, Reo heads upstairs with the knife and attempts to kill Toshio, but Kayako kills her by breaking her back.

Meanwhile, Mai Shono, a hotel staff member, is concerned about her younger sister, Yui, who disappeared mysteriously. She meets an apparition of Yui telling her about Toshio and receives a voice message that contains croaking noises. Receiving Yui's belongings, Mai finds Yui's former teacher book and searches for Toshio's address, but learns that the Saeki house has been demolished and barred from being built again by Kyosuke Takeda, who had lost his wife and sister-in-law to the curse. Mai asks Kyosuke for Reo's address but finds her house empty. Mai's boyfriend, the train station guard Sota Kitamura, questions Ena, a psychic girl living near Reo's house, as she has been recording Toshio's activities. Experiencing her telepathic visions, he goes to the house but is strangled by Toshio. Ending up killing him but surviving, Sota becomes paranoid and is eventually killed by Kayako in his and Mai's apartment.

Deciding to end the curse, Mai arrives at Reo's house again and meets with the ghosts of Reo and her mother. They present the possessed Ena as Toshio. It is then revealed that Toshio Yamaga, the true mastermind of the curse, has the ability to enter and leave other people's bodies. Toshio Yamaga had left Toshio Saeki's body when Sota killed him and now possesses Ena as his new vessel. Seeing Toshio leave Ena's body, Mai frantically tries to escape but is cornered by Kayako. Kayako suddenly changes into Yui, who bemoans about her suffering and states that the curse will never end. Yui laughing maniacally at Mai, she morphs back into Kayako, her mouth now cut and hanging wide open. The film ends with Toshio sitting at the kitchen and Mai, whispering "Help me," leaving her fate into the unknown.

Cast
 Airi Taira as 
 Renn Kiriyama as 
 Nonoka Ono as 
 Yurina Yanagi as 
 Miyabi Matsuura as 
 RIMI as 
 Kanan Nakahara as 
 Yuina Kuroshima as 
 Misaki Saisho as Kayako Saeki
 Kai Kobayashi as Toshio Saeki
 Yasuhito Hida as Takeo Saeki
 Yoshihiko Hakamada as 
 Nozomi Sasaki as 
 Hikakin as

References

External links
 Official website 
 
 

2015 horror films
Films about curses
Films directed by Masayuki Ochiai
Ju-On films
Japanese supernatural horror films
2010s Japanese films
2010s Japanese-language films